William S. Schnee (born July 4, 1947) is an American musician, music producer, and audio engineer. Schnee has been nominated 11 times for the Best Engineered Album, Non-Classical Grammy Award and worked on a multitude of other Grammy nominated and awarded albums. He has won two Grammys, an Emmy for Outstanding Sound for a Television Special, and a Dove Award. In a 45+ year career of very diverse artists, Schnee has received over 135 gold and platinum records and has recorded/mixed over 50 top twenty singles.

Early life
Schnee was born in Phoenix, Arizona, where he lived until he was 13. At that time, his family moved to California. Early musical training was in trumpet, saxophone and piano. In 1964, his senior year at Glendora High School, Schnee started a band, The LA Teens, writing songs and playing organ. Immediately after graduation, The LA Teens were signed to Decca Records. When their single releases had little success, the band was dropped, however, they were immediately signed by Mike Curb to work with producer/engineer Richie Podolor. While learning his craft, Schnee attended California State Polytechnic University, majoring in Business. Schnee then started law school at Loyola University, but took a leave of absence in the second semester to continue playing and recording music. Three years after being produced by Podolor, Schnee's big break came when he was hired to engineer in Podolor's studio. On Schnee's third day, Podolor put him in to record two tracks and some overdubs for Three Dog Night. Schnee never returned to law school.

Career
Schnee was instrumental in launching Sheffield Lab Records and the modern era direct to disc audiophile recordings, when in 1975 he produced the Thelma Houston and Pressure Cooker album, I've Got the Music in Me.  These audiophile albums were recorded in real time directly to the phonograph record cutting lathe. Schnee went on to produce several more of the direct to disc albums, including James Newton Howard and Friends, The Drum Record, and The Track Record.

Schnee has recorded and mixed with a wide variety of artists that include Steely Dan, Chicago, Ringo (with all the Beatles), Natalie Cole, Rod Stewart, Dire Straits, Whitney Houston, Carly Simon, The Pointer Sisters, Gladys Knight and the Pips, Barry Manilow, Michael Bolton, The Jacksons, Mark Knopfler, Barbra Streisand, Neil Diamond, Marvin Gaye, George Benson, Bette Midler, and Amy Grant. As a producer, Schnee has worked with Boz Scaggs, Joe Sample, Thelma Houston, Kiki Dee, and launched the careers of Huey Lewis and the News and Pablo Cruise. Schnee has also mixed the bulk of the Japanese mega-star Kazumasa Oda's albums.

Recording studio
In 1981, Schnee opened Schnee Studio in North Hollywood. Schnee and his fellow engineers built all of the equipment for the studio, including the discrete recording console and custom tube microphone preamps. The studio has an extensive collection of vintage tube microphones.

In 2015, Schnee Studio was sold and merged to become Studio 6 of the adjacent Larrabee Sound Studios.

Awards
Schnee has been nominated eleven times in the category of Best Engineered Album, Non-Classical, winning twice.

Grammy Awards
 1977  Aja – Best Engineered Album, Non-Classical
 1981  Gaucho –  Best Engineered Album, Non-Classical

Emmy Award
 1992 Outstanding Achievement in Sound Mixing For a Variety, Music series, or Special for "Unforgettable, With Love" by Natalie Cole.

Dove Award
 1995 Praise and Worship Album of the Year for Promise Keepers, Raise the Standard.

Selected works
Over the course of his career, Schnee has worked on over 600 albums
*Grammy Nominated for Best Engineered Album – Non Classical

 2015  That Lovin' Feeling – Steve Tyrell – engineer, mixing
 2014  My Dream Duets – Barry Manilow – engineer, mixing
 2014  Night Songs – Barry Manilow – mixing
 2013  It's Magic: The Songs of Sammy Cahn – Steve Tyrell – mixing
 2013  My Hope: Songs Inspired by the Message and Mission of Billy Graham – engineer, mixing
 2013  New Blood/No Sweat/More Than Ever – Blood, Sweat & Tears – producer
 2012  AM/FM – Rita Wilson – engineer
 2012  As Time Goes By/Stardust [The Great American Songbook, Vols. 2-3] – Rod Stewart – engineer
 2012  I'll Take Romance – Steve Tyrell – engineer, mixing
 2011  1 – Julio Iglesias – engineer
 2010  The Essential Herb Alpert- Herb Alpert – mixing
 2009  Priority/Black and White – Pointer Sisters – mixing
 2009  Anything Goes – Herb Alpert – engineer, mixing
 2009  Soulbook – Rod Stewart – mixing
 2008  Marcus – Marcus Miller – mixing
 2008  Still Unforgettable – Natalie Cole – engineer*
 2008  Benji Hughes – Benji Hughes – mixing
 2008  Encanto – Sergio Mendes – mixing
 2007  At the Movies – Dave Koz – engineer
 2007  Free – Marcus Miller – mixing
 2007  Home at Last – Billy Ray Cyrus – mixing
 2006  Romantic Classics – Julio Iglesias – engineer
 2005  Bette Midler Sings the Peggy Lee Songbook – Bette Midler – mixing
 2005  Altered State – Yellowjackets – engineer
 2005  Thanks for the Memory: The Great American Songbook, Vol. 4 – Rod Stewart – Audio engineer, engineer
 2005  Twilight of the Renegades – Jimmy Webb – mixing
 2004  Just for a Thrill – Ronnie Milsap – mixing
 2004  Sheffield Lab Drum and Track Disc – Sheffield Track Record – producer, engineer
 2004  Stardust: The Great American Songbook, Vol. 3 – Rod Stewart – engineer, String Engineer
 2003  Bette Midler Sings the Rosemary Clooney Songbook – Bette Midler – engineer, mixing
 2003  This Guy's in Love – Steve Tyrell – mixing
 2003  The Movie Album – Barbra Streisand – mixing
 2002  David Clayton-Thomas/Tequila Sunrise – David Clayton-Thomas – engineer, mixing
 2002  The Pecan Tree – Joe Sample – producer
 2002  The Christmas Album – Johnny Mathis – mixing
 2001  Christmas Memories – Barbra Streisand – mixing
 2001  On the Way to Love – Patti Austin – mixing
 2001  The Disney Album – Michael Crawford – mixing
 2000  Absolute Benson – George Benson – mixing*
 2000  Fingerprints – Larry Carlton – mixing
 2000  Here's to You Charlie Brown – David Benoit, engineer, mixing*
 2000  Tomorrow Today – Al Jarreau – engineer, mixing
 2000  Tutu/Amandla/Doo-Bop – Miles Davis – mixing
 1999  Body Language – Boney James – mixing
 1999  The Song Lives On – Lalah Hathaway – producer
 1999  Snowbound – Fourplay – engineer
 1998  As Time Goes By – Neil Diamond – engineer, mixing
 1998  The Movie Album: As Time Goes By – Neil Diamond – engineer, mixing
 1997  Artist of My Soul – Sandi Patty – mixing
 1997  Greatest Hits – Kenny G – engineer
 1997  Vulnerable – Marvin Gaye – mixing
 1996  Mandy Barnett – Mandy Barnett – producer
 1996  Full Circle – Randy Travis – mixing
 1996  In My Lifetime – Neil Diamond – engineer, mixing
 1996  Sheffield Jazz Experience – producer
 1996  That's Right – George Benson – engineer, mixing
 1996  The Sheffield Pop Experience – producer
 1995  The Tattooed Heart – Aaron Neville – mixing
 1994  Love is Always 17 – David Gates – mixing
 1994  Cohen Live – Leonard Cohen – mixing
 1994  Tenderness – Al Jarreau – mixing
 1993  Citizen Steely Dan – Steely Dan – engineer
 1993  Friends Can Be Lovers – Dionne Warwick – mixing
 1993  Love Remembers – George Benson – engineer, mixing
 1993  Love Songs – Diane Schuur – mixing
 1993  Screenplaying – Mark Knopfler – mixing
 1993  Starbox – Boz Scaggs – producer
 1993  The Sun Don't Lie – Marcus Miller – mixing
 1992  Home for Christmas – Amy Grant – mixing
 1992  Timeless: The Classics – Michael Bolton – engineer
 1991  Hard at Play – Huey Lewis & the News – producer
 1991  Healing the Wounds – The Crusaders – mixing
 1991  On Every Street – Dire Straits – engineer
 1990  Ashes to Ashes – Joe Sample – mixing
 1990  Blue Pacific – Michael Franks – mixing
 1990  Grand Piano Canyon  – Bob James – mixing
 1990  Neck and Neck' – Chet Atkins – mixing
 1989  Amandla – Miles Davis – mixing
 1989  Last Exit to Brooklyn – Mark Knopfler – mixing
 1989  No Holdin' Back – Randy Travis – mixing
 1989  Spellbound – Joe Sample – mixing
 1988  Get Here – Brenda Russell – mixing
 1988  Heart of Mine – Boz Scaggs – producer
 1988  Love Songs – David Sanborn – engineer, mixing
 1988  Other Roads – Boz Scaggs – producer
 1987  Get Close to My Love – Jennifer Holliday – engineer, mixing
 1986  Double Vision – Bob James – engineer, mixing
 1986  Tutu – Miles Davis – mixing, surround sound
 1985  Gettin' Away with Murder – Patti Austin – mixing
 1985  James Newton Howard and Friends – James Newton Howard – producer
 1985  Take No Prisoners – Peabo Bryson – mixing
 1985  Greg Rolie – Greg Rolie – producer
 1985  Whitney Houston – Whitney Houston – mixing
 1984  Home Again – Judy Collins – mixing
 1984  Love Language – Teddy Pendergrass – mixing
 1984  In London – Al Jarreau – engineer
 1983  Merciless – Stephanie Mills – mixing
 1983  Uncle Wonderful – Janis Ian – mixing
 1982  So Excited! – Pointer Sisters – mixing
 1982  Angel Heart – Jimmy Webb – mixing
 1982  Missin' Twenty Grand – David Lasley – producer, engineer, mixing
 1982  Stand by the Power – the Imperials – producer, engineer
 1982  Chicago 16 – Chicago – mixing
 1982  Dreamgirls [Original Broadway Cast Album] – mixing
 1981  The Jacksons: Live – The Jacksons – engineer, mixing
 1981  Growing Up in Hollywood Town – Lincoln Mayorga and Amanda McBroom – engineer, mixing*
 1980  New Baby – Don Randi and Quest – engineer, mixing*
 1980  Alibi – America – mixing
 1980  Gaucho – Steely Dan – engineer*
 1980  Gideon – Kenny Rogers – mixing
 1980  Huey Lewis and the News – Huey Lewis & the News – producer
 1980  Middle Man – Boz Scaggs – producer
 1979 Dr. Heckle and Mr. Jive – England Dan and John Ford Coley – mixing
 1979  Stoneheart- Brick – producer
 1979  Part of the Game – Pablo Cruise – producer
 1979  September Morn – Neil Diamond – engineer, mixing
 1978  Leo Sayer – Leo Sayer – engineer
 1978  Worlds Away – Pablo Cruise- producer
 1978  You Don't Bring Me Flowers – Neil Diamond – mixing engineer, supervisor
 1977  If Love is Real – Randy Edleman – producer
 1977  A Place in the Sun – Pablo Cruise – engineer, mixing
 1977  Aja – Steely Dan – engineer*
 1977  Discovered Again – Dave Grusin – engineer, mixing*
 1977  I'm Glad You're Here with Me Tonight – Neil Diamond – engineer, mixing
 1977  Making a Good Thing Better – Olivia Newton-John – engineer, mixing
 1976  Farewell Fairbanks – Randy Edleman – producer
 1976  Don't Stop Believin – Olivia Newton-John – mixing
 1976  Endless Flight – Leo Sayer – engineer
 1976  Follow My Mind – Jimmy Cliff – mixing
 1976  I've Got a Reason – Richie Furay – producer
 1975  Breakaway – Art Garfunkel – mixing
 1975  I've Got the Music in Me – Thelma Houston – producer, engineer, mixing* 1975  Melissa – Melissa Manchester – engineer, Remixing
 1975  Playing Possum – Carly Simon – engineer, Remixing
 1974  Goodnight Vienna – Ringo Starr – Audio engineer, engineer, Remixing
 1974  Hotcakes – Carly Simon – engineer, Remixing
 1974  Lincoln Mayorga & Distinguished Colleagues, Vol. 3 – Lincoln Mayorga – engineer, mixing* 1974  Live! – Marvin Gaye – engineer, mixing
 1973  Barbra Streisand...and Other Musical Instruments – Barbra Streisand – mixing
 1973  Ringo – Ringo Starr – engineer, mixing
 1972  David Clayton-Thomas – David Clayton-Thomas – mixing
 1972  LaCroix – Jerry Lacroix – producer
 1972  Live Concert at the Forum – Barbra Streisand – engineer
 1972  No Secrets – Carly Simon – engineer, mixing*' 1971  Barbra Joan Streisand – Barbra Streisand – engineer, mixing

Scores for movies and television

 2011  Rio [Music from the Motion Picture] – engineer, mixing
 2001  Atlantis: The Lost Empire [Original Soundtrack] – James Newton Howard – engineer
 2000  Space Cowboys [Original Soundtrack] – engineer, mixing
 1997  Space Jam [Original Score] – James Newton Howard – engineer, mixing
 1997  The Postman [Original Score/Soundtrack] – James Newton Howard – producer
 1996  E.R.: Original Television Theme Music and Score – producer
 1995  Father of the Bride, Pt. 2 [Original Soundtrack] – Alan Silvestri – mixing
 1994  The Swan Princess [Original Soundtrack] – mixing
 1992  The Bodyguard [Original Motion Picture Soundtrack]'' – engineer
 1991  The Prince of Tides [Original Soundtrack] – James Newton Howard – mixing
 1989  Beaches [Original Soundtrack] – Bette Midler – engineer
 1987  The Princess Bride [Original Soundtrack] – Mark Knopfler – mixing
 1985  Promised Land [Original Score] – James Newton Howard – engineer

References

External links
 
 
 Bill Schnee Interview NAMM Oral History Library (2021)

Record producers from Arizona
American audio engineers
Living people
Grammy Award winners
Emmy Award winners
1947 births